is a wetland area located in the northern part of the city of Misawa, Aomori Prefecture, in the northern Tōhoku region of Japan. The wetland is connected to the eastern shores of Lake Ogawara at the base of the Shimokita Peninsula.

Protected area
Land reclamation projects began in the 1960s to convert the area into rice paddy fields.  In the year 2002, the Ministry of the Environment classified the area to be one of the 500 Important Wetlands in Japan particularly for its diversity of avian life, particularly as a nesting area for the  Japanese marsh warbler Subsequently, 737 hectares of the site received national protection as a bird sanctuary on November 1, 2005, of which 222 hectares received the additional designation of a Special Protected Area. This same 222 hectare portion of the site was further designated as a Ramsar Site in on November 8, 2005.

The area is noted for its biodiversity. Per a survey made by the Ministry of the Environment in the year 2000, the area contained:。

Flora: 52 families, 228 species
Mammals: 7 families, 11 species
Bird: 37 families, 161 species
Amphibians: 6 families. 7 species
Fish: 5 families, 8 species
Insects: 43 families, 274 species

Birds
Hotokenuma is home to the Japanese marsh warbler (Locustella pryeri) and the Japanese reed bunting (Emberiza yessoensis), both listed as near-threatened on the IUCN Red List.

See also
Ramsar Sites in Japan

References

External links
Ransar home page for Hotokenuma 

Ramsar sites in Japan
Landforms of Aomori Prefecture
Wetlands of Japan
Misawa, Aomori
Bird sanctuaries
IUCN Category IV